Margaret Leighton, CBE (26 February 1922 – 13 January 1976) was an English actress, active on stage and television, and in film. Her film appearances included (her first credited debut feature) in Anatole de Grunwald's The Winslow Boy (1948). For The Go-Between (1971), she won the BAFTA Award for Best Actress in a Supporting Role and was nominated for the Academy Award for Best Supporting Actress.

Leighton began her career on stage in 1938, before joining the Old Vic and making her Broadway debut in 1946. A four-time Tony Award nominee, she twice won the Tony Award for Best Actress in a Play: for the original Broadway productions of Separate Tables (1957) and The Night of the Iguana (1962). She also won an Emmy Award for a 1970 television version of Hamlet.

Life and career
Born in Barnt Green, Worcestershire, Leighton made her stage debut as Dorothy in Laugh with Me (1938), which also was performed that year for BBC Television. She became a star of the Old Vic. Her Broadway debut was as the Queen in Henry IV (1946), starring Laurence Olivier and Ralph Richardson during a visit of the Old Vic to the U.S., and the company performed a total of five plays from its repertoire before returning to London.

After appearing in two British films, including the starring role of Flora MacDonald opposite David Niven in Bonnie Prince Charlie (1948) and in the popular The Winslow Boy (also 1948), the actress appeared in Alfred Hitchcock's Under Capricorn (1949) and the crime/mystery Calling Bulldog Drummond (1951). In the U.S., she portrayed the wife of a presidential candidate in The Best Man (1964).

Leighton won the Tony Award for Best Actress in a Play for her performance in Separate Tables (1956); she won another Tony in that category for The Night of the Iguana (1962), playing Hannah Jelkes (a role played by Deborah Kerr in the film version) opposite Bette Davis's Maxine Faulk. Leighton was nominated for Best Actress in a Play for Much Ado About Nothing (1959) and for Tchin-Tchin (1962). Her last appearance on Broadway was as Birdie Hubbard in a revival of Lillian Hellman's The Little Foxes (1967).

She had a noteworthy list of TV appearances, including Alfred Hitchcock Presents, Ben Casey and Burke's Law. She won the Emmy Award for Outstanding Performance by an Actress in a Supporting Role in Drama for Hamlet (1970) and she was nominated for an Emmy in 1966 for Outstanding Single Performance by an Actress in a Leading Role in a Drama for four episodes of Dr. Kildare. Her final TV performance was in the first season of Space: 1999 where she played Queen Arra in the episode "Collision Course."

For her film role as Mrs Maudsley in The Go-Between (1971), Leighton won the British BAFTA Film Award for Best Supporting Actress. She also received an Oscar nomination for Best Supporting Actress for the role. She received a BAFTA nomination for Best British Actress for her role as Valerie Carrington in Carrington V.C. (1954).

Personal life
Leighton was married three times, to publisher Max Reinhardt from 1947 to 1955, to actor Laurence Harvey from 1957 to 1961, and to actor Michael Wilding from 1964 until her death. She had no children by any of the marriages.

She was appointed a CBE in 1974. Leighton died of multiple sclerosis in 1976, aged 53, in Chichester, Sussex.

Filmography

Film

Television

Awards and nominations

References

External links

1922 births
1976 deaths
Best Supporting Actress BAFTA Award winners
Commanders of the Order of the British Empire
Deaths from multiple sclerosis
Neurological disease deaths in England
Outstanding Performance by a Supporting Actress in a Drama Series Primetime Emmy Award winners
English film actresses
English stage actresses
English television actresses
Actresses from Worcestershire
People from Bromsgrove District
English Shakespearean actresses
Tony Award winners
20th-century English actresses
British expatriate actresses in the United States